The Sarkar of Kashmir (Persian: کشمیر سرکار) later the Subah of Kashmir (Persian: کشمیر صوبہ) was a province of the Mughal Empire encompassing the Kashmir region, now divided between Pakistan (Muzaffarabad division) and India (Kashmir division). It was separated from the Kabul Subah and was made into an imperial province under administrative reforms carried by emperor Shah Jahan in 1638. The province ceased to exist when the Durrani forces, under Ahmed Shah Abdali, entered Kashmir in 1752 and captured Quli Khan, the last Mughal Subahdar.

Geography 
The Kashmir Subah was bordered on the north by the Maqpon Kingdom of Baltistan, to the east by the Namgyal Kingdom of Ladakh, to the west by the Kabul Subah, the south by Lahore Subah, and to the south east by the semi autonomous hill states of Jammu.

References 

Mughal Empire